Hernán Pérez may refer to:

 Hernán Pérez (footballer) (born 1989), Paraguayan footballer
 Hernán Pérez (baseball) (born 1991), Venezuelan baseball player
 Hernán Pérez de Ovando, Spanish military man and nobleman
 Hernán Pérez de Quesada, Spanish conquistador in Colombia, Peru and Ecuador

See also 
Hernán-Pérez, a municipality in Spain